Bronson Xerri ("sherry") (born 10 September 2000) is an Australian former professional rugby league footballer who last played in 2019, as a  for the Cronulla-Sutherland Sharks in the National Rugby League (NRL). He is suspended from playing in the NRL until November 2023 due to a doping violation.

To date, he is one of only two players in the history of the game (the other being Anthony Xuereb) with a last name beginning with the letter "X".

Background
Xerri was born in Sydney, New South Wales, Australia, and is of Maltese descent. 

He played his junior rugby league for the Aquinas Colts.

Career

2019
Xerri made his debut in Round 4 of the 2019 NRL season against the Parramatta Eels. Xerri went on from there and kept playing in the centres for the next two rounds of the season where he scored his first NRL career try against the Penrith Panthers in Round six at Melbourne Albert park 

In Round 10 against rivals St George, Xerri scored his first career hat-trick as Cronulla won the match 22–9 at Kogarah Oval.  The following week, Xerri scored two tries as Cronulla defeated Parramatta 42–22.
In Round 20, Xerri scored 2 tries as Cronulla defeated South Sydney 39–24 at Shark Park.
In Round 22 against St George, Xerri scored the winning try as Cronulla won the match 18–12 at Shark Park.

At the end of the 2019 regular season, Cronulla finished in 7th place on the table.  Xerri played in the club's elimination final match which Cronulla lost 28–16 against Manly-Warringah at Brookvale Oval with Xerri scoring a try in the loss.

2020
On 26 May 2020, Xerri was provisionally suspended after failing a drug test.

On 1 September, Xerri's B-Sample returned and confirmed he had tested positive to use of anabolic steroids.  The NRL released a statement saying “The National Rugby League (NRL) has today issued Cronulla-Sutherland Sharks player Bronson Xerri with a Notice of Alleged Anti-Doping Rule Violations under the NRL’s Anti-Doping Policy,” the NRL said in a statement.

“This follows the return of a positive sample and completion of the anti-doping process administered by Sport Integrity Australia.

“The Notice alleges that Mr Xerri breached the policy through the presence, use and possession of Anabolic Androgenic Steroids prohibited by the World Anti-Doping Agency (WADA) and the NRL’s Anti-Doping Policy".

2021
On 23 March, the NRL confirmed that Xerri had been formally suspended for four years following a ruling made by the NRL Anti-Doping Tribunal. Xerri will be free to resume his career from November 2023.

In response to his appeal being rejected and the ban upheld, Xerri said “For all you haters calling me a drug cheat, you all have no clue how much I put in the work to be where I was, and to my loyal family and friends, words can’t express how much you all mean to me.  The comeback is on, 2024".

2022
On 2 December, it was announced that the Canterbury-Bankstown Bulldogs had offered Xerri a two-year deal starting in 2024 after his doping ban is completed.

References

External links
Sharks profile

2000 births
Living people
Australian people of Maltese descent
Australian rugby league players
Cronulla-Sutherland Sharks players
Doping cases in rugby league
Newtown Jets NSW Cup players
People educated at Endeavour Sports High School
Rugby league centres
Rugby league players from Sydney